The Wilmington Journal is a newspaper in Wilmington, North Carolina. It is North Carolina's oldest existing newspaper for African Americans. R. S. Jervay established the paper in 1927. It continued under his son Thomas C. Jervay Sr.

History
It succeeded the Daily Record that was destroyed in the Wilmington Massacre of 1898. It was established in 1927. Fundraising efforts in 2021 helped save the newspaper's building at 412 South 7th Street.

Mary Alice Thatch served as editor and covered the Wilmington 10.

References

Newspapers established in 1927
1927 establishments in North Carolina
Newspapers published in North Carolina